Richard Sennett  (born 1 January 1943) is the Centennial Professor of Sociology at the London School of Economics and former University Professor of the Humanities at New York University. He is currently a Senior Fellow of the Center on Capitalism and Society at Columbia University. Sennett has studied social ties in cities, and the effects of urban living on individuals in the modern world.

He has been a Fellow of The Center for Advanced Study in the Behavioral Sciences, of the American Academy of Arts and Sciences, and of the Royal Society of Literature. He is the founding director of the New York Institute for the Humanities.

Early life and education 
Sennett grew up in the Cabrini Green housing project in Chicago, to a Jewish family of Russian emigres. As a child he trained in music, studying the cello and conducting, working with Claus Adam of the Juilliard String Quartet and the conductor Pierre Monteux. When a hand injury put an end to his musical career, he entered academia. He studied under David Riesman, Erik Erikson, and Oscar Handlin at Harvard, graduating with his Ph.D. in the History of American Civilization in 1969. His intellectual life as an urbanist came into focus during the time he spent as a fellow of the Joint Center for Urban Studies of Harvard and MIT.

Career
Sennett's scholarly writing centers on the development of cities, the nature of work in modern society, and the sociology of culture. Families Against the City, his earliest book, examines the relationship between family and work in 19th-century Chicago. A subsequent quartet of books explores urban life more largely: The Uses of Disorder, an essay on identity formation in cities; The Fall of Public Man, a history of public culture and public space, particularly in London, Paris, and New York in the 18th and 19th Centuries; The Conscience of the Eye, a study of how Renaissance urban design passed into modern city planning, and Flesh and Stone, an overview of the design of cities from ancient to modern times.

Another quartet of books is devoted to labor. The Hidden Injuries of Class is a study of class consciousness among working-class families in Boston; The Corrosion of Character explores how new forms of work are changing our communal and personal experience; Respect probes the relation of work and reforms of the welfare system; and The Culture of the New Capitalism provides an overview of these changes.
Authority is an essay in political theory; it addresses the tools of interpretation by which we recast raw power into either legitimate or illegitimate authority.

Sennett is working on a project called 'Homo Faber,' exploring material ways of making culture. The first book in this series is The Craftsman, published in 2008; subsequent volumes are Together: The Rituals, Pleasures, and Politics of Cooperation, published in 2012, and Building and Dwelling: Ethics for the City (2018) on the making of the urban environment.

In the public realm, Sennett founded, and directed for a decade, the New York Institute of the Humanities at New York University. Sennett then chaired a United Nations commission on urban development and design. As president of the American Council on Work, Sennett led a forum, sponsored by the Rockefeller Foundation, for researchers trying to understand the changing pattern of American labor. Most recently he helped create, and has chaired, the LSE Cities Programme at the London School of Economics. The Urban Age project also emerged as a product of the research and ideas by Sennett and others at LSE Cities. In 2006, he served as Chair of the jury of the Venice Biennale.

Personal life
Sennett has been married to sociologist Saskia Sassen since 1987.

Awards
 2006 – winner of the Hegel Prize awarded by the German city of Stuttgart, 
 2008 – awarded the Gerda Henkel Prize, worth 100,000 Euros, by the Gerda Henkel Foundation of Düsseldorf, Germany, 
 2009 – awarded the Heinrich Tessenow Medal, an honour which, until then, had been reserved for architects and designers.
 2015 – awarded Premio Hemingway
 2016 – received the Prix Européen de l'Essai awarded by the Charles Veillon Foundation in Lausanne. 
 2018 – appointed Officer of the Order of the British Empire (OBE) for services to design in the 2018 New Year Honours 
 2018 – elected Fellow of the British Academy (FBA).

Selected works 
Nineteenth Century Cities: Essays In The New Urban History, coauthor, Yale (1969)
Classic Essays on the Culture Of Cities, editor (1969),  
The Uses of Disorder: Personal Identity and City Life (1970),  
Families Against the City: Middle Class Homes of Industrial Chicago, 1872–1890, Harvard (1970),  
The Hidden Injuries of Class, with Jonathan Cobb, Knopf (1972),  
The Fall of Public Man, Knopf (1977),  
Authority (1980),  
The Conscience of the Eye: The design and social life of cities, Faber and Faber (1991),  
Flesh and Stone: The Body and the City In Western Civilization, Norton (1994), 
The Corrosion of Character, The Personal Consequences Of Work In the New Capitalism, Norton (1998), 
Respect in a World of Inequality, Penguin (2003),  
The Culture of the New Capitalism, Yale (2006),  
The Craftsman, Allen Lane (2008),  
The Foreigner: Two Essays on Exile, Notting Hill (2011), 
Together: The Rituals, Pleasures, and Politics of Cooperation, Yale (2012), 
Building and Dwelling: Ethics for the City, Farrar, Straus and Giroux (2018), 
The Quito Papers and the New Urban Agenda, Routledge (2018), 

Fiction
The Frog Who Dared to Croak (1982), 
An Evening of Brahms (1984)
Palais-Royal (1986), 

Literature on Richard Sennett
Dominik Skala: Urbanität als Humanität. Anthropologie und Sozialethik im Stadtdenken Richard Sennetts. Paderborn: Schoeningh (2015), 
 Igor Pelgreffi: "Soggetto, tecnica, scrittura. Su How I write: Sociology as Literature di Richard Sennett ", in M. Iofrida (Eds) Officine Filosofiche, 2, Mucchi, Modena 2015, pp. 95–108 
 Igor Pelgreffi: "Qualità artigianale del lavoro. Elementi per un'antropologia filosofica in Richard Sennett", in M. Iofrida (Eds) Officine Filosofiche, 3, Mucchi, Modena 2016, pp. 95–108

References

External links 
 
LSE faculty profile
Guardian: Richard Sennett
Article (09/2005)
Article (02/2001)
Interview (01/2006)
BBC (01/2006) 
Guantánamo in Germany (with Saskia Sassen) in The Guardian, 21 August 2007 (concerning arrest of German sociologist Andrej Holm suspected of links to the Militante gruppe (mg))
Discussion on Craft and skills
New York Times Book Review (6 April 2008)
 Interviewed by Alan Macfarlane 3 and 24 April 2009 (video)
Audio: Richard Sennett in conversation on the BBC World Service discussion show The Forum
 Richard Sennett, No one likes a city that's too smart, 4 December 2012
 Audio: We have lost the balance between cooperation and competition, L.I.S.A.interview 12 July 2012

1943 births
Academics of the London School of Economics
American people of Russian-Jewish descent
American sociologists
Jewish American social scientists
Fellows of the Royal Society of Literature
Officers of the Order of the British Empire
Living people
Jewish philosophers
Urban sociologists
Urban theorists
New York University faculty
Family sociologists
Harvard University alumni
Center for Advanced Study in the Behavioral Sciences fellows
Honorary Fellows of the London School of Economics
Philosophers of technology
Fellows of the British Academy
21st-century American Jews